The 2012 KPL Top 8 Cup was the second edition of the football tournament which ran from 14 March to 19 August 2012. It was contested by the top 8 teams of the 2011 Kenyan Premier League season: A.F.C. Leopards, Chemelil Sugar, Gor Mahia, Rangers, Sofapaka, Sony Sugar, Tusker and Ulinzi Stars.

Ulinzi Stars were the defending champions, having won their first title in the inaugural edition of the tournament, but were denied a second title after losing to champions Gor Mahia in the final.

2011 Kenyan Premier League standings

Bracket

Quarter-finals
The quarter-final ties were played between 14 March and 29 July 2012.

Gor Mahia−A.F.C. Leopards match
The Nairobi derby match scheduled for 1 April 2012 was postponed, as Gor Mahia were banned from the Nyayo National Stadium following an incident that led to a riot by Gor fans during another derby match on 18 March 2012. However, A.F.C. Leopards were dissatisfied with the ruling made by the IDCC and opted to drop out of the tournament, but it had been decided that the match would take place on 20 May 2012. Lack of a suitable venue to host the clash led to the match being postponed yet again. Gor Mahia were however allowed to play in the Moi International Sports Centre, allowing for the fixture to be played. The date for the match was confirmed to be 29 July 2012, with the venue as the Moi International Sports Centre in Kasarani. However, Gor Mahia are yet to have their ban from the Nyayo National Stadium lifted.

Gor Mahia were awarded a walkover and 2 goals for their match after A.F.C. Leopards failed to turn up. The latter were consequently fined KSh.500,000/=, even though they had previously stated that they would not honour the fixture, citing no consultation of an appropriate date with the KPL and financial problems. However, KPL CEO Jack Oguda had stated that Leopards were to be fined KSh 1.5 million/=, and may have to pay another KSh.3.5 million/= fine, linked to the incurred expenses that broadcasters SuperSport could forward to the KPL. The Football Kenya Federation, however, suspended the result after, having demanded to be furnished with security measures to be taken for and the rules and regulations governing the tournament, the KPL failed to reply with furnishings. The suspension was lifted on 1 August 2012 after a consultative meeting held between FKF and KPL officials. The FKF also nullified the fine that was imposed on A.F.C. Leopards, after the club released an official press statement explaining the reason why they failed to appear for their match against Gor Mahia.

Fixtures

Semi-finals
The semi-finals were played between 2 August and 9 August 2012.

First leg

Second leg

Ulinzi Stars won 3−2 on aggregate.

Gor Mahia won 4−0 on aggregate.

Final
The final was played on 19 August 2012, at the Moi International Sports Centre.

References

External links
Kenyan Premier League - Official Website
Futaa.com - Top 8 Cup 2012

KPL Top 8 Cup seasons
Top 8 Cup